Antonio Filippo Ciucci was an Italian physician of the 17th century who wrote one of the first treatises of forensic toxicology, "II Filo di Arianna" ("Ariadne's thread").

References

17th-century Italian physicians
1710 deaths
Forensic scientists
Year of birth unknown